On & Off (or On and Off) is a South Korean television program that airs on tvN.

Season 1 of the program aired on Saturdays, from May 2 to December 5, 2020.

Season 2 of the program aired on Tuesdays, from February 16 to May 25, 2021.

Airtime

Overview
It is a show of personal documentary, where celebrities share their "On" (busy working daily life) and/or "Off" (private/at home) moments of their lives. These moments are observed and commented.

Cast

Season 1
 Sung Si-kyung
 Jo Se-ho
 Kim Min-ah

Season 2
 Uhm Jung-hwa
 Sung Si-kyung
 Nucksal
 Yoon Park
 Choa

Episodes

Season 1 (2020)
 No episode on October 3 due to Chuseok, and Parasite was aired instead.

Notes

Season 2 (2021)
 No episode on April 13, and episode 1 of House on Wheels Season 2 was aired instead.

Notes

Awards and nominations

References

South Korean reality television series
2020 South Korean television series debuts
TVN (South Korean TV channel) original programming
Korean-language television shows